The 2005 Atlantic Coast Conference baseball tournament was held at the Baseball Grounds of Jacksonville in Jacksonville, Florida, from May 25 through 29.  Georgia Tech won the tournament and earned the Atlantic Coast Conference's automatic bid to the 2005 NCAA Division I baseball tournament.

Tournament

Play-In Bracket
The four teams with the worst records in regular season conference play faced each other in a single elimination situation to earn the 8th spot in the conference tournament.

Main Bracket

All-Tournament Team

(*)Denotes Unanimous Selection

See also
College World Series
NCAA Division I Baseball Championship

References

TheACC.com 2005 Baseball Championship Info

Tournament
Atlantic Coast Conference baseball tournament
Atlantic Coast Conference baseball tournament
Atlantic Coast Conference baseball tournament
21st century in Jacksonville, Florida
Baseball competitions in Jacksonville, Florida
College baseball tournaments in Florida